There are a number of electoral districts by the name of Mitchell:

 Electoral district of Mitchell (South Australia)
 Electoral district of Mitchell (Western Australia) (1983–2005), renamed Electoral district of Leschenault in 2005 and abolished in 2008.
 Electoral district of Mitchell (Queensland), abolished in 1932.
Mitchell (UK Parliament constituency)